Morden is a former provincial electoral division in the Canadian province of Manitoba, which was represented in the Legislative Assembly of Manitoba from 1888 to 1914. The district was centred on the town of Morden in the southernmost part of the province.

After 1914, the district was merged into Morden and Rhineland.

List of representatives

References

Former provincial electoral districts of Manitoba